Old Stone Store may refer to:

Old Stone Store, or Clarendon Stone Store, Clarendon, New York, listed on the NRHP in Orleans County, New York
Rollin Sprague Building, Rochester, Michigan, also known as the Old Stone Store, listed on the NRHP in Oakland County, Michigan

See also
 Old Stone Shop, Lyme, New York, NRHP listed building
 Old Rainworth Stone Store (built 1862) Cairdbeign, Central Highlands Region, Queensland, Australia
 Old Stone Blacksmith Shop, Cornwall, Vermont, NRHP listed building
 Stone Store, New Zealand's oldest stone building